Cosne-sur-Loire station is the railway station in Cosne-Cours-sur-Loire, Bourgogne-Franche-Comté, France. The station is located on the Moret-Lyon railway. The station is served by Intercités (long distance) and TER (local) services operated by SNCF.

Train services

The station is served by intercity and regional trains towards Montargis, Nevers and Paris.

Gallery

References

Railway stations in Nièvre
Railway stations in France opened in 1861